Zaječar City Stadium is a multi-use stadium in Zaječar, Serbia. It is the home ground of FK Timok. The stadium has a capacity of 10,000 spectators. A new football stadium is under construction in Zaječar and the current stadium will be turned into an athletics stadium.

References

External links

Sport in Zaječar
Football venues in Serbia
Multi-purpose stadiums in Serbia